The Baltimore Gazette, also known as the Baltimore Daily Gazette and The Gazette, was a daily newspaper published in Baltimore, Maryland between 1862 and 1875.  It broke some high-profile stories including the fact that The Turk, allegedly a chess playing machine, worked because a human chess master was operating it from the inside.

The paper was associated with several high-profile figures in publishing and politics, including William Hinson Cole and William Wilkins Glenn.

In 2016, the name was revived in the form of a fake news website.

References

Newspapers published in Baltimore
Fake news websites